Lajos Szigeti (27 November 1906 – 27 April 1974) was a Hungarian boxer who competed in the 1932 Summer Olympics and in the 1936 Summer Olympics. He was born in Budapest.

In 1932 he was eliminated in the quarterfinals of the middleweight class after losing his fight to the eventual bronze medalist Ernest Peirce of South Africa. Four years later he lost in the second round of the 1936 Olympic middleweight class against Josef Hrubeš.

1932 Olympic results

 Round of 16: bye
 Quarterfinal: lost to Ernest Peirce (South Africa) by decision

References

External links
 Profile 

1906 births
1974 deaths
Middleweight boxers
Olympic boxers of Hungary
Boxers at the 1932 Summer Olympics
Boxers at the 1936 Summer Olympics
Hungarian male boxers
Boxers from Budapest